"El Comegente" is a song recorded by American metal band Soulfly for their ninth album Savages. The song plays a slow, death-laden grooves, followed by Led Zeppelin-like acoustic bass solo performed by Tony Campos beginning about five minutes into the song. Guitarist Marc Rizzo calls this solo "Mars Part Two."

Campos was the first to suggest the song about the serial killer and cannibal Dorángel Vargas, titling after Vargas' nickname El comegente (Spanish for "people eater"). He helped Max Cavalera write lyrics and sing together — Campos screams in Spanish while Cavalera growls in Portuguese.

References

External links 
Lyrics

Soulfly songs
Songs written by Max Cavalera
2013 songs